Kanava is a village in the Solomon Islands, on Rennell Island in the Rennell and Bellona province.

Location
Travel easterly for approx 15 km or 45min from Tigoa (village located just prior to Tbamagu Village

Population

80 people approx.

Religion
South Seas Evangelical Church (SSEC)

Police
Generally policing is serviced by the Tigoa police station

Populated places in Rennell and Bellona Province